Willy Kaiser-Heyl (4 August 1876 – 2 December 1953) was a German film actor. He appeared in 92 films between 1919 and 1952. He was born in Frankfurt, Germany and died in Berlin.

Selected filmography

 The Tragedy of a Great (1920)
 Im Rausche der Milliarden (1920)
 Der Janus-Kopf (1920)
 The Lady in Black (1920)
 Die Fluch der Menschheit (1920)
 My Wife's Diary (1920)
 At War in the Diamond Fields (1921)
 The Living Propeller (1921)
 The Secrets of Berlin (1921)
 A Debt of Honour (1921)
 The Favourite of the Queen (1922)
 Fratricide (1922)
 Girl of the Berlin Streets (1922)
 Frauenmoral (1923)
 The Affair of Baroness Orlovska (1923)
 Count Cohn (1923)
 The Fifth Street (1923)
 The Vice of Gambling (1923)
 The Sensational Trial (1923)
 I Had a Comrade (1923)
 Lord Reginald's Derby Ride (1924)
 The Voice of the Heart (1924)
 Wunder der Schöpfung (1925)
 Neptune Bewitched (1925)
 Destiny (1925)
 The King and the Girl (1925)
 The Telephone Operator (1925)
 The Ones Down There (1926)
 The False Prince (1927)
  Fire in the Opera House (1930)
  Marriage in Name Only (1930)
 Him or Me (1930)
 Cruiser Emden (1932)
 Anna and Elizabeth (1933)
 Music in the Blood (1934)
  The Empress's Favourite  (1936)
 Paul and Pauline (1936)
  Napoleon Is to Blame for Everything (1938)
 Nanon (1938)
 Robert Koch (1939)
 Cadets (1939)
 In the Name of the People (1939)
 Target in the Clouds (1939)
 Anna Alt (1945)

References

External links

1876 births
1953 deaths
German male film actors
German male silent film actors
Actors from Frankfurt
20th-century German male actors